This article is about the particular significance of the year 1792 to Wales and its people.

Incumbents
Lord Lieutenant of Anglesey - Henry Paget 
Lord Lieutenant of Brecknockshire and Monmouthshire – Henry Somerset, 5th Duke of Beaufort
Lord Lieutenant of Caernarvonshire - Thomas Bulkeley, 7th Viscount Bulkeley
Lord Lieutenant of Cardiganshire – Wilmot Vaughan, 1st Earl of Lisburne
Lord Lieutenant of Carmarthenshire – John Vaughan  
Lord Lieutenant of Denbighshire - Richard Myddelton  
Lord Lieutenant of Flintshire - Sir Roger Mostyn, 5th Baronet 
Lord Lieutenant of Glamorgan – John Stuart, Lord Mountstuart
Lord Lieutenant of Merionethshire - Watkin Williams
Lord Lieutenant of Montgomeryshire – George Herbert, 2nd Earl of Powis
Lord Lieutenant of Pembrokeshire – Richard Philipps, 1st Baron Milford
Lord Lieutenant of Radnorshire – Thomas Harley

Bishop of Bangor – John Warren
Bishop of Llandaff – Richard Watson
Bishop of St Asaph – Lewis Bagot
Bishop of St Davids – Samuel Horsley

Events
3 June - Monmouthshire Canal receives its Act of Parliament.
21 June - Iolo Morganwg holds the first Gorsedd ceremony at Primrose Hill in London.
June - The Merthyr to Newbridge section of the Glamorganshire Canal is completed.
Bodnant House is built.

Arts and literature

New books
David Davis (Castellhywel) - Cri Carcharor dan farn Marwolaeth
Nicholas Owen - Carnarvonshire, a Sketch of its History, etc.
Hester Thrale - The Three Warnings

Births
10 February - John Jones (Ioan Tegid), writer (died 1852)
23 July - Aneurin Owen, scholar (d. 1851)
5 September - Sir David Davies, royal physician (d. 1865)
11 November - Mary Anne Evans (d. 1872), future wife of British prime minister Benjamin Disraeli
20 December - David Griffiths, missionary (d. 1863)
date unknown - Sir Charles John Salusbury, 3rd Baronet (d. 1868)

Deaths
23 February - Thomas Ellis, clergyman, about 80
10 March - John Stuart, 3rd Earl of Bute, friend of Augusta, Princess of Wales and ancestor of the Marquesses of Bute, 78
17 May - Sir Noah Thomas, royal physician, 72?
27 June - John Morgan (of Dderw), politician, 48
unknown date - John Edwards, poet (Siôn Ceiriog), 44/45

References

Wales
Wales